Ghulam Rasool Santosh (1929 – March 10, 1997), also known as G. R. Santosh, was a prominent Indian painter and poet. He was best known for his themes inspired by Kashmir Shaivism. In 1979, he became the recipient of Sahitya Akademi Award for his poem titled Be Soakh Rooh.

Early life
He was born Ghulam Rasool in a Kashmiri Muslim family of modest means in the Chinkral Mohalla habba kadal neighborhood of old Srinagar. He dropped out of school after his father's death and took up odd jobs like writing, painting signboards, weaving silk and whitewashing walls. In 1954 he won a scholarship to study fine arts under a celebrated Indian painter, N. S. Bendre in the city of Baroda, in the state of Gujarat, in western India.

Around the same time he did what was considered unusual and unacceptable in conservative Kashmiri society - he married his childhood sweetheart, Santosh, who was a Kashmiri Pandit, and also assumed her name.

Career
In the early 1960s, Santosh studied Tantric (mystical) art and Kashmir Shaivism. In 1964 he adopted this style to create some of the best examples of modern Tantric paintings. His paintings are known for the vibrancy of colors, neat lines, spiritual energy and sensuousness. His paintings have been exhibited in notable international shows including the Tenth São Paulo Art Biennial, 1969 and the 'Neo-Tantra: Contemporary
Indian Art Inspired by Tradition' exhibition at University of California, Los Angeles, 1985.

Santosh also wrote plays, poetry and essays in Kashmiri. He was also an authority on Kashmiri Shaivism, and was one of the very few people who could read and write the ancient, and almost-extinct, Kashmiri script called Sharda.

Death
He died on March 10, 1997, in New Delhi, India. He was survived by his wife, a son and a daughter.

See also

References

Kashmiri people
1929 births
1997 deaths
Recipients of the Padma Shri in arts
Recipients of the Sahitya Akademi Award in Kashmiri